The Israel Open, formerly called Hatzor International, in badminton is an international open held in Israel since 1975. It was held annually from 1975 to 1982, but between 1983 and 2005 the competition was held only thrice. The competition was resumed in 2006 under a new name Hatzor International, after the club which host the event at Kibbutz Hatzor. Israeli National Badminton Championships started in 1977.

Previous winners

Performances by nation

References 

Badminton tournaments
Badminton tournaments in Israel
Sports competitions in Israel
Recurring sporting events established in 1975